Tallong railway station is a heritage-listed railway station located on the Main South line in New South Wales, Australia. It serves the village of Tallong, opening in 1869 as a small halt named Barbers Creek Tank. A platform was opened on 16 April 1878 and it was renamed Tallong on 6 April 1905. It was added to the New South Wales State Heritage Register on 2 April 1999.

Platforms & services
Tallong has two side platforms. It is serviced by early morning and evening NSW TrainLink Southern Highlands Line services travelling between Sydney Central, Campbelltown, Moss Vale and Goulburn.

During the day it is served by one NSW TrainLink road coach service in each direction between Moss Vale and Goulburn.

Transport links
Berrima Buslines operates one route to and from Tallong railway station:
813: to Moss Vale

Description 

The station complex consists of a type 7 station building constructed ) with concrete platforms. The station signs are also heritage-listed.

The station dam and reservoir was first built in 1869, rebuilt in 1888, and had the dam wall raised in 1917. The corrugated iron clad pump station had its equipment changed to oil in 1911. The dam precinct also includes cast iron Atlas Engineering water tanks on metal stands and standard metal water columns with a swing arm, situated on the western side of the railway line.

Heritage listing 
Tallong station and dam group is one of the very few surviving sites with a dam and associated facilities that are visible from the line and a station location. The dam itself and pump house are significant elements in the industrial heritage of the railways. The station group is a significant early group of timber buildings from the 1870s through to early this century. All are rare surviving examples.

Tallong railway station was listed on the New South Wales State Heritage Register on 2 April 1999 having satisfied the following criteria.

The place possesses uncommon, rare or endangered aspects of the cultural or natural history of New South Wales.

This item is assessed as historically rare. This item is assessed as scientifically rare. This item is assessed as arch. rare. This item is assessed as socially rare.

References

Attribution

External links

Tallong station details Transport for New South Wales

Railway stations in Australia opened in 1869
Regional railway stations in New South Wales
Short-platform railway stations in New South Wales, 2 cars
New South Wales State Heritage Register
Articles incorporating text from the New South Wales State Heritage Register
Tallong, New South Wales
Main Southern railway line, New South Wales